The 1985 Benson & Hedges Championships was a men's tennis tournament played on indoor carpet courts at the Wembley Arena in London in England that was part of the 1985 Nabisco Grand Prix. It was the 10th edition of the tournament and took place from 11 November until 17 November 1985. First-seeded Ivan Lendl won his second consecutive singles title at the event.

Finals

Singles

 Ivan Lendl defeated  Boris Becker 6–7, 6–3, 4–6, 6–4, 6–4
 It was Lendl's 10th singles title of the year and the 52nd of his career.

Doubles

 Guy Forget /  Anders Järryd defeated  Boris Becker /  Slobodan Živojinović 7–5, 4–6, 7–5

References

External links
 ITF tournament edition details

Benson and Hedges Championships
Wembley Championships
Benson and Hedges Championships
Benson and Hedges Championships
Benson and Hedges Championships
Tennis in London